Gianfranco Gazzaniga Farías (born 22 November 1993) is an Argentine footballer who plays for Spanish club Racing de Ferrol as a goalkeeper. Despite being born in Ecuador, he also holds Argentine nationality.

Club career
Born in Sucre as his father was representing Deportivo Cuenca, Gazzaniga moved to Spain in 2007, joining UD Almería's youth setup. He made his senior debut with the reserves on 9 October 2011, starting in a 2–1 Segunda División B away win against CD Badajoz.

Gazzaniga subsequently became a regular starter for Almería's B-side before leaving the club on 21 June 2017 and signing for fellow third division side CD El Ejido. On 9 July of the following year, he moved to SD Ponferradina in the same category.

Gazzaniga contributed with 20 appearances during the 2018–19 season, as his side returned to Segunda División after three years. On 15 July 2019, he renewed his contract with Ponfe. Initially a third-choice behind José Antonio Caro and Manu García, he made his professional debut on 14 January 2020 by starting in a 0–1 away loss against Málaga CF.

On 15 June 2021, free agent Gazzaniga signed for Primera División RFEF side Racing de Ferrol.

Personal life
Gazzaniga comes from a family of goalkeepers: his father Daniel played professionally in Argentina, Ecuador and Bolivia, while his older brother Paulo built his career in England.

References

External links

1994 births
Living people
People from Sucre
Argentine footballers
Ecuadorian footballers
Association football goalkeepers
Segunda División players
Segunda División B players
Tercera División players
UD Almería B players
SD Ponferradina players
Racing de Ferrol footballers
Argentine expatriate footballers
Ecuadorian expatriate footballers
Argentine expatriate sportspeople in Spain
Ecuadorian expatriate sportspeople in Spain
Expatriate footballers in Spain